The 2019 season will be DPMM FC's 8th consecutive season  in the top flight of Singapore football and in the Singapore Premier League. Along with the SGPL, the club will also compete in the Singapore Cup.

The club has also entered a domestic team to compete in the 2018–19 Brunei Premier League. DPMM became Brunei Premier League champions on 26 February.

On 15 September 2019, Brunei DPMM FC became champions of the 2019 Singapore Premier League with two games to spare after a 4–4 draw between Geylang International and Hougang United meant that DPMM's lead at the top of the table cannot be surpassed.

Squad

S.League squad

Coaching staff

Transfers

Pre-Season transfers

In

Out

Trial

Mid-season transfer

In

Out

Friendly

Team statistics

Appearances and goals

Competitions

Overview

Singapore Premier League

Singapore Cup

Semi-final

Warriors FC won 4-2 on penalty after 5-5 aggregate.

3rd/4th place

See also 
 2017 DPMM FC season
 2018 DPMM FC season

Notes

References 

DPMM FC seasons
DPMM FC